Yessey is a rural locality (a settlement) in Evenkiysky District of Krasnoyarsk Krai, Russia, located on the shore of Lake Yessey.

History 
The historian of Siberia, B.O. Dolgikh, writes that in 1628 Ostrog was built by the Mangazey Cossacks - collectors of yasak (royal tribute).

In 1852, local residents (Yakuts and Evenks) were the first among the indigenous population to accept the Orthodox faith. In 1892, the first Orthodox church in Evenkia was built with the donations of merchants. In 1984, Under Soviet rule, the church was demolished. In 2018, the head of the Evenki region, Yevgeny Vasilyev, decided to build the church of St. Basil the Great in Yessey.

Climate
Yessey has a subarctic climate (Köppen climate classification Dfc) with extremely cold winters and mild summers. Precipitation is quite low but is somewhat higher in summer than at other times of the year.

References

Rural localities in Krasnoyarsk Krai
Evenkiysky District